Julio María Sosa Venturini (February 2, 1926 – November 26, 1964), usually referred to simply as Julio Sosa or El Varón del Tango, was a Uruguayan tango singer.

Biography
Sosa was born in Las Piedras, a Canelones Department suburb of Montevideo, Uruguay. He moved to Buenos Aires, Argentina, in 1949, where he became famous with the Orquesta Francini-Pontier the Orquesta típica formed by the violinist Enrique Mario Francini and the bandoneonist Armando Pontier. Working with numerous other orchestras, he was reunited with Pontier in 1955, with whom he recorded several best-selling albums on the RCA Victor and Columbia labels and became one of the most important tango singers in the genre's history.

He married Nora Ulfed in 1958 and had a daughter. His marriage ended in separation, however, and he settled into a relationship with Susana Merighi. His towering masculinity and reserved strength earned him the nickname El Varón del Tango ("The Man's Man of Tango"). Sosa also published a book of poetry, Dos horas antes del alba ("Two Hours Before the Dawn"), in 1960. Following his switch to Columbia Records in 1961, the Pontier orchestra incorporated a new bandoneonist, Leopoldo Federico, and the association helped make the group the most successful in its genre, at the time.

Sosa's fame acquainted him with sports cars as well. He had numerous accidents during the early 1960s, mostly as a result of speeding. He was behind the wheel of a Auto Union 1000S Fissore coupé when, in the early hours of November 26, 1964, he crashed at high speed into a traffic light on Buenos Aires' Figueroa Alcorta Avenue, killing himself at age 38.

References

1926 births
1964 deaths
People from Las Piedras, Uruguay
Tango singers
Uruguayan tango musicians
20th-century Uruguayan male singers
Uruguayan expatriates in Argentina
Road incident deaths in Argentina